Stand by Your Man is a 1981 American made-for-television biographical film based on the life of Tammy Wynette, the country music superstar, including her tumultuous marriage to fellow star George Jones.

Cast

Annette O'Toole as Tammy Wynette
Tim McIntire as George Jones
James Hampton as Billy Sherrill
Cooper Huckabee as Euple Byrd
Monica Parker as Jane
Robert Carnegie as Glen Daley
Fredric Cook as Richard

Reception
The Washington Post published a largely negative review of the movie, with critic Richard Harrington stating that "Unfortunately, television will be television, and the results are lackluster and somewhat misleading." However, James Wolcott, in a review of 1985's Sweet Dreams (in which Jessica Lange played Patsy Cline), called O'Toole "superb" as Wynette.

References

External links
 

 

1981 in American television
1981 television films
1981 films
Biographical television films
Cultural depictions of country musicians
CBS network films
Films with screenplays by John Gay (screenwriter)
Films directed by Jerry Jameson